Karsan Jest is a low-floor minibus produced by Turkish automobile company Karsan.

History 
Karsan Jest started production in 2013. It was designed by Karsan affiliate Hexagon Studio. Production is based in Bursa, Akçalar. 70% of the parts in the bus are produced in Turkey.

Engine 
Karsan Jest's engine is diesel. The engine is a front-wheel drive, Common Rail, four cylinder, 2.3 liters, 129 horsepower and produces 320 Nm energy. It does not have an automatic version.

Features 
An optional version of the bus includes wifi. The bus has a total of 5 seating options. A ramp for disabled people to get off and on the bus is available.

References 

Karsan vehicles
Minibuses
Vehicles introduced in 2013